The Toronto Varsity Blues women's ice hockey program represents the University of Toronto in the Ontario University Athletics conference of U Sports. Three-time Olympic medalist Vicky Sunohara has served as head coach since the 2011–12 season.

History

On December 12, 1922, the Lady Blues joined the Ladies Ontario Hockey Association (LOHA) and paid dues of eleven dollars: six dollars association fee, five dollars one time fee. The Lady Blues were the LOHA Provincial Champions in 1924. In 1925, the Lady Blues withdrew from the LOHA, taking issue with certain unsatisfactory aspects of competition and debate as to the acceptable definition of womanhood.

In 1993, (although the Lady Blues won 13 of the last 15 provincial championships), a task force recommended that the University of Toronto cut the team for financial reasons. Justine Blainey, a member of the team, organized a "Save the Team" night that raised over $8,000. She personally called 100 alumni during a one-week fundraising blitz. Blainey had previously earned national recognition as she endured five different court cases before finally having her case heard by the Supreme Court of Canada in 1986 because the Metro Toronto Hockey League denied her the opportunity to play hockey for them in 1981.

During the 2000-01 regular season, the Lady Blues accumulated an undefeated record with 22 wins and no losses or ties. They outscored all opponents by a 114-14 margin. In the OUA playoffs, the Lady Blues defeated Toronto rival York University by a 4-1 mark and shut out Laurier 5-0 to win the OUA championship.

Heading into the 2001 National Championships, the Lady Blues were seeded Number 1 overall. The Lady Blues first game was a resounding 12–1 victory over the hosting Calgary Dinos. In the semifinal, the Lady Blues would proceed to eliminate the McGill Martlets by a 4–1 tally. The championship game was a closer affair, with the Lady Blues besting the Regina Cougars in a 4-3 triumph. It was the Lady Blues first national championship in CIS women’s hockey. Of note, the Varsity Blues managed to defeat every other top team in the nation that season. The teams that were defeated included Regina, Concordia, Alberta, McGill and Saskatchewan, as the Lady Blues finished with an overall win loss record of 35-0-0.

Notable games

On February 25, 1997, a little-known rule denies the Blues’ their second consecutive title. The OWIAA gold medal game in Waterloo, Ontario resulted in a controversial finish. Lady Blues player Jayna Hefford scored 23 seconds into overtime in the OWIAA gold medal game against the York Yeowomen at Waterloo Memorial Arena. The Lady Blues believed they had claimed the provincial championship.

OWIAA league rules indicated that the first five-minute overtime session in a playoff game must be played in its entirety (as a regular period). It was advised that the game would continue after Hefford's goal. York University (known as the Yeowomen at the time) tied the game with 1:47 left in the first overtime. Sari Krooks broke in on the right wing and scored on Keely Brown.

A second overtime period began and this overtime period was classified as sudden death. York skater Shanley White took advantage of a Lady Blues clearing error. She scored on the error and York prevailed by a 3-2 mark in double overtime to claim the OWIAA gold medal. The Lady Blues loss ended the Blues' undefeated season, and gave York its first championship in 10 years.

The two played a scoreless opening period, but the Lady Blues scored ten seconds into the second period when Hefford passed to linemate Laura Schuler, and beat goalie Debra Ferguson. York tied the game 26 seconds into the third period which led into overtime. Despite winning the silver medal, the Lady Blues ended its regular season with a 13-0-2 record. In the semifinal, the Lady Blues defeated the Guelph Gryphons by a 4-1 tally. In that game, Laura Schuler had a hat trick, while Hefford added three assists.

On February 11, 2000, the Ontario University Athletics women's ice hockey program saw its longest game take place. The University of Toronto's Rhonda Mitchell scored on a 35-foot slap shot. It was the 5:07 mark of the eighth period and the Varsity Blues defeated the York Lions women's ice hockey program. Although the victory allowed the U of T to advance to the OUA gold medal game, it was the longest in the history of Canadian women's hockey. The game lasted over five hours and ten minutes. York's player of the game was goaltender Debra Ferguson, who made 63 saves over 125 minutes in net.

U Sports Tournament results
In Progress

Player awards and honours
 Alison Houston, 2001 CIS Goaltending Champion (0.40 GAA)
 Karen Hughes, CIS coach of the Year, 2001
 Jen Rawson, 2001 CIS Tournament MVP honors

University Awards
2020 Toronto Varsity Blues Female Rookie of the Year: Natasha Athanasakos
2014 Toronto Varsity Blues Female Athlete of the Year:  Nicole Kesteris

OUA Awards
 Karen Hughes, 2001 OUA Coach of the Year
 Jen Rawson, 2001 OUA all-star
 Jen Rawson, 2001 OUA Athlete of the Year
 Vicky Sunohara, 2021,2022,2023 OUA Female Coach of the Year

OUA All-Stars
Taylor Day – Forward – 2017 OUA First-Team All-Star
Cristine Chao – Defence – 2017 OUA First-Team All-Star

OUA Most Sportsmanlike

U Sports Awards
Erica Fryer, U Sports Athlete of the Month, January 2020

Marion Hilliard Award
The Marion Hilliard Award recognizes excellence in an OUA women's hockey student-athlete in three areas: hockey, academics and community involvement.
 Bridget Bates, 1999
 Jenny McRae, 2003
 Sue McCutcheon, 2005

All-Canadian honours
First Team
 Urszula May, 1999 CIS First Team All-Canadian

Second Team
 Ali MacMillan, 1998 CIS Second Team All-Canadian
 Sue Anne Van Damme, 1998 CIS Second Team All-Canadian
 Jen Rawson, 2000 CIS Second Team All-Canadian
 Heather Vance, 2000 CIS Second Team All-Canadian
 Alison Houston, 2001 CIS Second Team All-Canadian
 Susie Laska, 2001 CIS Second Team All-Canadian
 Jen Rawson, 2001 CIS Second Team All-Canadian
 Alison Houston, 2003 CIS Second Team All-Canadian
 Kim Malcher, 2003 CIS Second Team All-Canadian
 Safiya Muharuma, 2004 CIS Second Team All-Canadian
 Kim Devereaux, 2006 CIS Second Team All-Canadian
 Stephanie Lockert, 2007 CIS Second Team All-Canadian

U Sports All-Rookie
Cristine Chao, 2015-16 U Sports All-Rookie

International
Annie Del Guidice : 2009 Winter Universiade 
Karen Hughes General Manager : 2009 Winter Universiade  
Nicole Kesteris : 2015 Winter Universiade
Lauren Straatman : Ice hockey at the 2019 Winter Universiade

Lady Blues in Olympic hockey

Blues in pro hockey

The following players were selected in the 2010 CWHL Draft.

See also
 Ontario University Athletics women's ice hockey

References

University of Toronto
U Sports women's ice hockey teams
Women's ice hockey teams in Canada
Ice hockey teams in Ontario
Toronto Varsity Blues
Women in Ontario